The 1964 LSU Tigers football team represented Louisiana State University during the 1964 NCAA University Division football season.

Schedule
The game versus Florida was originally scheduled for October 3, but was postponed until December 5 due to the threat of Hurricane Hilda on the original game date.

References

LSU
LSU Tigers football seasons
Sugar Bowl champion seasons
LSU Tigers football